Ernest Hiscock (9 April 1868 – 16 December 1895) was an Australian cricketer. He played in four first-class matches for South Australia between 1890 and 1894.

See also
 List of South Australian representative cricketers

References

External links
 

1868 births
1895 deaths
Australian cricketers
South Australia cricketers
Cricketers from Adelaide